Strays Don't Sleep is an album by Strays Don't Sleep. It was released in 2006 by One Little Indian. The band made short films to accompany the album.

Critical reception
AllMusic called Strays Don't Sleep "a small gem of an album." The Skinny wrote: "It's a nice enough collection of songs, drawing on every last trick from the melancholy-acoustic textbook, the only trouble is that not one of the nine songs on offer raises the stakes beyond average." Paste wrote that "from its dark, understated melodies and instrumentation to its elegant production, this record is an archetype for urban folk music." The Sunday Times called the album "a work of fragile, studio-bound electronica."

Track listing

CD
"Love Don't Owe You Anything" —Words – Matthew Ryan; Music – Matthew Ryan, Neilson Hubbard
"Pretty Girl" —Words – Neilson Hubbard; Music – Neilson Hubbard, Matthew Ryan
"Martin Luther Avenue" —Words – Matthew Ryan; Music – Matthew Ryan, Neilson Hubbard
"Night Is Still" —Words – Neilson Hubbard; Music – Matthew Ryan, Neilson Hubbard
"For Blue Skies" —Words – Matthew Ryan; Music – Neilson Hubbard, Matthew Ryan
"Spirit Fingers" —Words – Neilson Hubbard; Music – Matthew Ryan, Neilson Hubbard
"April's Smiling At Me" —Words – Neilson Hubbard; Music – Matthew Ryan, Neilson Hubbard
"Cars And History" —Words – Matthew Ryan; Music – Neilson Hubbard, Matthew Ryan
"Falling Asleep With You" —Words – Neilson Hubbard; Music – Matthew Ryan, Neilson Hubbard
"You Belong To Me" [Bonus Track on US edition] —Words, Music – Pee Wee King, Redd Stewart, Shilton Price
"Stay" [Bonus Track on US edition] —Words, Music – Paul Buchanan, Robert Bell

DVD
"Love Don't Owe You Anything"Directed by The Barnes Brothers
"Pretty Girl"Directed by Martin Glenn
"Martin Luther Avenue"Directed by Neilson Hubbard, Matthew Ryan; Shot, Edited by Matt Riddlehoover
"Night Is Still"Directed by Martin Glenn
"For Blue Skies"Directed by Matthew Ryan, Neilson Hubbard; Shot, Edited by Matt Riddlehoover, Neilson Hubbard, Matthew Ryan; Featuring Mark CabusThe Film Inside The Film – Directed by Abe Bradshaw, Edited by James "Buddy" Villani
"Spirit Fingers"Directed by Jared Johnson
"April's Smiling At Me"Directed by Matt Boyd
"Cars And History"Directed by Gorman Bechard; Featuring scenes from his film You Are Alone
"Falling Asleep With You"Directed by Matthew Ryan; Shot by Lauwrence Boothy, Tonie Floyd; Edited by Rich Jegen, Kenny Bernstein
"Pretty Girl" [Bonus Version]Directed by Matt Boyd

Personnel
Neilson Hubbard – vocals, Guitar, synth, Piano, Loops, percussion
Matthew Ryan – vocals, Guitar, synth, Piano, Bass, percussion
Brian Bequette – Guitar, Bass, Accordion
Billy Mercer – Bass
Steve Lantanation – drums, percussion, backing vocals
Produced by Matthew Ryan, Neilson Hubbard
Recorded by Neilson Hubbard at Mr. Lemons – Eastside, Nashville
Mixed by Neilson Hubbard, Matthew Ryan at Mr. Lemons – Eastside, Nashville
Spirit Fingers – Mixed by Richard McLaurin at Mr. Lemons – Eastside, Nashville
Mastered by Marc Chevalier at Yes Master – Westside, Nashville

Films
Executive Producer – Kenny Bernstein
Produced by Matthew Ryan, Neilson Hubbard
5.1 Surround Sound – Mixed, Mastered by Paul PDub Walton, London
Digitized, Compiled, Sweetened, Authored by Rich Jegen
Menu Page Designed by Robert Bright
Cover – Self Portrait by Christie Creasy
Back Panel Photo by Sharlene France
Design, Layout by Jay Johnson
Legal Services – Trip Aldredge
Booking – Little Big Man
Contact, Inquiries – info@straysdontsleep.com

Additional musicians
Doug Lancio – Baritone, Guitar, percussion
Jeff Patterson – Tambourine
Garrison Starr – backing vocals on Spirit Fingers
Clay Steakley – Bass
Kate York – backing vocals on For Blue Skies

References

2005 albums
Strays Don't Sleep albums